The Crowsnest Highway is an east-west highway in British Columbia and Alberta, Canada. Mostly two-lane, the highway was officially designated in 1932, mainly following a mid-19th-century gold rush trail originally traced out by an engineer named Edgar Dewdney. It takes its name from the Crowsnest Pass, the location at which the highway crosses the Continental Divide between British Columbia and Alberta.

In British Columbia, the highway is entirely in mountainous regions and is also known as the Southern Trans-Provincial Highway. The first segment between the Trans-Canada Highway and Highway 5A is locally known as the Hope-Princeton Highway, and passes by the site of the Hope Slide. In Alberta, the terrain is initially mountainous, before smoothing to foothills and eventually generally flat prairie in the vicinity of Pincher Creek. The highway forms part of the Red Coat Trail and the CANAMEX Corridor from Highway 2 near Fort Macleod to Highway 4 in Lethbridge.

Route description 
Crowsnest Highway is designated a core route in Canada's National Highway System, and is designated as Highway 3 for its entire length.

British Columbia 

The Crowsnest Highway's western terminus is at Hope, where it branches off from the Trans-Canada Highway (Highway 1).

The Crowsnest Highway travels for  through Bonanza Pass to its junction with Highway 3B at Nancy Greene Lake, which is the cutoff to Rossland and Trail.

The Crowsnest Highway continues through the Kootenay Pass on the Salmo-Creston Highway, a stretch known colloquially as the Kootenay Skyway, or Salmo-Creston Skyway.   east of Burnt Flat, the Crowsnest Highway reaches Creston, just past junctions with Highway 21 and Highway 3A.   later, south of Yahk, Highway 95 merges onto the Crowsnest Highway.

Alberta 

Highway 6 splits south near Pincher Creek. It proceeds for  into the town of Fort Macleod, after which Highway 2 splits south to Cardston and the United States border. Highway 3 then crosses the Oldman River east of Fort Macleod near Monarch, prior to a partial interchange with Highway 23.

After Coalhurst, the highway reaches Westview Drive W, which provides access to West Lethbridge. It then becomes a freeway named Crowsnest Trail as it reaches Highway 25 which branches north to Picture Butte while University Drive runs south to the University of Lethbridge as the main thoroughfare through West Lethbridge. Highway 3 again crosses the Oldman River in central Lethbridge and the freeway segment ends at Mayor Magrath Drive, marking the northern terminus of Highway 5. The highway meets the northern end of Highway  4 at the eastern limit of Lethbridge before continuing east to Coaldale and Taber. The highway reduces to a two-lane undivided road and the Crowsnest Highway ends  later at the Trans-Canada Highway in Medicine Hat.

Future
Alberta Transportation has long-term plans to upgrade the entire Highway 3 corridor to a freeway from the British Columbia border to Medicine Hat. The plans include the construction of a Lethbridge bypass to render the CANAMEX Corridor free-flowing through southern Alberta, in combination with proposed bypasses of Fort Macleod, Claresholm and Nanton. The route would split from Highway 3 west of Coalhurst and run east, bypassing Lethbridge and Coaldale to the north before rejoining the existing highway.

During the 2021 British Columbia floods, the Crowsnest Highway was closed by landslides, as were the other routes connecting the Lower Mainland with the rest of Canada. It was the first of these routes to reopen. During the period when it was the only road route between Metro Vancouver and the rest of Canada, it experienced a high rate of crashes among heavy trucks driving faster than the route's windy curves would allow for.

Major intersections 
The following is a list of major intersections along the Crowsnest Highway:

See also 

CANAMEX Corridor
Dewdney Trail
Kettle Valley Railway (southern mainline of the CPR)
Pan-American Highway
Red Coat Trail
Yellowhead Highway

References

External links 
Crowsnest Highway

Alberta provincial highways, 1–216 series
British Columbia provincial highways
Trans-Canada Highway